Aleksandar Zabrčanec is a former president of FK Pobeda in the Macedonian First League. Zabrčanec received a lifetime ban by the UEFA in 2009 after he was found to have fixed a qualifying match.

References

Living people
Year of birth missing (living people)
FK Pobeda
Banned sportspeople
Football people in North Macedonia
Match fixers
Place of birth missing (living people)